Christopher Dwayne Tomlin (born May 4, 1972) is an American contemporary Christian music singer, songwriter, and worship leader from Grand Saline, Texas, United States, who has sold over 7 million records. He is a member of Passion Conferences and is signed to EMI's sixstepsrecords. Some of his most well-known songs are "How Great Is Our God", "Our God", "Whom Shall I Fear (God of Angel Armies)" and his cover of "Good Good Father".

Tomlin has been awarded 23 GMA Dove Awards, a Grammy Award for Best Contemporary Christian Music Album for his 2012 album And If Our God Is for Us..., and two RIAA certified platinum albums. Because of his songs' popularity in many contemporary churches, Time magazine stated he may be the "most often sung artist anywhere". Tomlin's 2013 album Burning Lights debuted at No. 1 on the Billboard 200 chart, becoming the fourth CCM album in history to do so.

Early life
Tomlin was born in Grand Saline, Texas in 1972 to Donna and Connie Tomlin. He has two younger brothers, Ryan and Cory. Tomlin was given his first guitar by his father and learned how to play along with Willie Nelson records.

Tomlin wrote his first worship song at age fourteen. During high school, he learned to lead worship in his youth group. After graduating from Grand Saline High School in 1990, he entered Tyler Junior College (TJC) planning for a medical or physical therapy career. Tomlin graduated in 1992 and enrolled in Texas A&M University to study medicine. He grew active in a campus Christian group called Breakaway, where he became the worship leader. In 1994, Tomlin graduated from Texas A&M with a bachelor's degree in psychology. After college Tomlin participated as a worship leader at various camps in Texas, including Dawson McAllister Youth Conferences. While at Breakaway, Tomlin participated in a Bible study led by Choice Ministries founder Louie Giglio. In 1997, Tomlin partnered with Giglio to found Passion Conferences.

Career
In 1995, Tomlin released Inside Your Love, which was released independently. In 1998, he released Authentic on Sparrow Records.

In 2000, Tomlin signed onto newly founded sixstepsrecords, a subsidiary of Passion Conferences. His first nationally released solo project, titled The Noise We Make, was released in 2001, featuring the song "Forever". He released the live EP 545 and his second studio album Not to Us in 2002.

Since his signing onto sixstepsrecords, Tomlin has released nine full-length studio albums. 2004's Arriving was the first to chart on Billboard's Hot Christian Albums chart and the Billboard 200. Tomlin has topped the Hot Christian Albums chart six times, and his 2013 album Burning Lights topped the Billboard 200, making the album only the fourth contemporary Christian album to do so.

Tomlin has also released one live album, recorded in Austin Music Hall, and two Christmas albums (2009, 2015), both of which topped the Holiday albums chart on Billboard.

Tomlin has toured with many contemporary Christian artists, such as Delirious?, Steven Curtis Chapman, Michael W. Smith, and MercyMe. Tomlin has headlined several tours, and has also joined Passion Conferences for national and global tours and events. Tomlin has also participated in various other conferences festivals including Grand Saline's annual Salt Festival in Texas, Hillsong's 2007 conference, and the SoCal Harvest in Anaheim.

On June 14, 2007, Tomlin's version of the song "Indescribable" was used as the official wake-up call for Mission Specialist Patrick Forrester on Space Shuttle mission STS-117.

Other ventures 
Tomlin is one of the members of CompassionArt, a charity and songwriting team that released an album in 2008. In 2014, he became a member on the board of directors of CURE International, a nonprofit organization that provides medical care to children in the developing world.

In May 2008, Tomlin announced a move from the Austin Stone Community Church, to start a new church with Louie Giglio in Atlanta, Georgia. The Passion City Church held its first service on February 15, 2009, and features Tomlin as one of its worship leaders.

Personal life

Tomlin married Lauren Bricken on November 9, 2010. Together they have three daughters, Ashlyn, Madison and Elle. They live on a  estate on the outskirts of Franklin, Tennessee which they have nicknamed "Peacefield".

Discography

Independent releases
Inside Your Love (1995)
Authentic (1998)
Too Much Free Time (1998) [with Ross King]

Commercial releases
The Noise We Make (2001)
Not to Us (2002)
Arriving (2004)
See the Morning (2006)
Hello Love (2008)
And If Our God Is for Us... (2010)
Burning Lights (2013)
Love Ran Red (2014)
Never Lose Sight (2016)
Holy Roar (2018)
Chris Tomlin & Friends (2020)
Always (2022)

Awards and achievements
According to Christian Copyright Licensing International's list of the top 25 worship songs in the US in August 2007, Tomlin held five spots with songs he has either written, co-written or performed: "How Great Is Our God" (No. 1), "Forever" (No. 5), "Holy Is the Lord" (No. 7), "We Fall Down" (No. 12), and "Indescribable" (No. 22) (written by Laura Story). In 2008, Tomlin held 6 spots on 20 The Countdown Magazine top 20 praise and worship songs: "We Fall Down" (No. 14), "Forever" (No. 10), "Holy is the Lord" (No. 8), "Indescribable" (No. 6), "Amazing Grace (My Chains Are Gone)" (No. 3), and "How Great is our God" (No. 1). In 2012, CCLI reported that his songs were performed more than 3 million times in churches around the world. Time magazine has called him "most often sung artist anywhere" in 2006, and in 2013, he was also pronounced the most sung songwriter in the world. In 2017, he became only the fourth artist to receive the Sound Exchange Digital Radio Award for surpassing a billion digital radio streams, and in 2018, he became the first Christian artist to receive the Billionaire award from Pandora for reaching a billion Pandora streams.

Grammy Awards

GMA Dove Awards
Throughout his career, Chris Tomlin has been nominated for 32 Dove Awards (6 of them collaborative efforts) and won 19 of them.

 *Denotes a collaborative effort or a song contribution to a "Various artists" album.
 1 The song was performed by Tomlin, but written and produced by Laura Story.
 2 The song was performed by LaRue Howard, but written by Tomlin.

Billboard Music Awards

Others
Tomlin was nominated for two 2009 Visionary Award: Male Entertainer of the Year and Song of the Year for "Jesus Messiah".

Bibliography
Chris Tomlin, The Way I Was Made: Words and Music for an Unusual Life, Multnomah, 2004.

Filmography

See also
Chris Tomlin discography

References

External links
 
 Luscombe, Belinda (November 19, 2006). "Hip Hymns Are Him". Time.

1972 births
Living people
20th-century American singers
20th-century Christians
21st-century American singers
21st-century Christians
American Christians
American male singer-songwriters
American performers of Christian music
Composers of Christian music
Christian music songwriters
Grammy Award winners
Musicians from Austin, Texas
Performers of contemporary worship music
Singer-songwriters from Texas
Sixstepsrecords artists
Sparrow Records artists
Texas A&M University alumni
Tyler Junior College alumni
People from Grand Saline, Texas
20th-century American male singers
21st-century American male singers